Holy Spirit Roman Catholic Separate Regional Division No.4 or Holy Spirit Catholic Schools is the Catholic school authority in Lethbridge, Alberta, Canada.

Size
The Holy Spirit Roman Catholic Separate Regional Division No. 4 runs 15 schools in Lethbridge, Taber, Coaldale, Picture Butte, Bow Island and Pincher Creek. The school board enrollment for 2009/2010 was a total of 4,510 students.

Schools
Bow Island
 St. Michael's School (Pre-K-12)

Coaldale
 St. Joseph's School (Pre-K-9)

Lethbridge
 Catholic Central High School (10-12)
 Catholic Central High School (West Campus)
 Children of St. Martha School (Pre-K-6)
 École St. Mary School (Pre-K-6)
 Father Leonard Van Tighem School (Pre-K-9)
 Our Lady of the Assumption School (Pre-K-6)
 St. Francis Junior High (7-9)
 St. Patrick's Fine Arts School (K-6)
 St. Paul School (K-6)
 St. Theresa of Calcutta (K-6)

Picture Butte
 St. Catherine's School (Pre-K-9)

Pincher Creek
 St. Michael's School (Pre-K-12)

Taber
 St. Mary's School (6-12)
 St. Patrick's School (Pre-K-5)

References

External links
Holy Spirit Roman Catholic Separate School Division No.4

School districts in Alberta
Education in Lethbridge